Elections to Trafford Council were held on 3 May 1984.  One third of the council was up for election, with each successful candidate to serve a four-year term of office, expiring in 1988. The Conservative Party retained overall control of the council.

Due to the death of one of the candidates for Timperley ward after the close of nominations, the election for Timperley was postponed until 28 June 1984. The result shown on this page is the result of that election.

After the election, the composition of the council was as follows:

Ward results

References

1984 English local elections
1984
1980s in Greater Manchester
May 1984 events in the United Kingdom